Early general elections were held in the Cook Islands on 3 December 1974. The result was a victory for the ruling Cook Islands Party (CIP), which won 14 of the 22 seats in the Legislative Assembly with 64% of the vote. The Democratic Party won the remaining eight seats. CIP leader Albert Henry remained Premier.

Background
The early elections were called by Henry following a visit to New Zealand for the funeral of Prime Minister Norman Kirk, stating that he also wanted to hold a vote on self-government or integration into New Zealand. A planned referendum would have seen voters given the options of independence, self-government or integration. However, the referendum plans were later dropped.

Campaign
Henry's government refused to allow the three thousand Cook Islanders living in New Zealand to vote by post, most of whom were expected to vote for the Democratic Party. Henry also obstructed attempts to charter an Air New Zealand plane for voters to fly home. However, the Democratic Party was able to charter  an Air Nauru Boeing 727 to fly in some voters. Voters paid their own fares, and the flights were open to all regardless of party affiliation.  The tactic was copied by the government at the next election, though with public money.

Democratic Party attempts to distribute leaflets to outer islands were also stopped by Henry.

Results

Elected members

Aftermath
After the CIP lost their two-thirds majority and ability to amend the constitution, Henry threatened to take action against Democratic Party supporters working in the islands' civil service.

When the newly elected Assembly convened, Marguerite Story was re-elected as Speaker.

References

Elections in the Cook Islands
General election
Cook Islands
Cook Islands
Election and referendum articles with incomplete results